Babatunde Adewale (born December 19, 1974) professionally known as Tee A is a Nigerian comedian, master of ceremonies, TV show host and content producer.

Early life and education 
Tee A was born in Lagos, Nigeria. He had his primary school education in St. Paul's Anglican primary school Idi oro. Muslin before proceeding to Birch Freeman High School Surulere Lagos and then to the University of Lagos Akoka Yaba Lagos and American Comedy Institute  ACI, New York.

Career 
Tee A started out as a stand up comedian as  an undergraduate in University of Lagos in 1995. He met his mentor Alibaba Akpobome in 1996 and became further inspired to pursue a full-time career in comedy and in the entertainment industry.

References

1974 births
Living people
Nigerian entertainment industry businesspeople
Male actors from Lagos
University of Lagos alumni